The UNC Kenan–Flagler Business School is the business school of the University of North Carolina at Chapel Hill. Founded in 1919, the school was renamed to its current name in honor of Mary Lily Kenan and her husband, Henry Flagler, in 1991.

The school offers programs of granting bachelor of science in business administration, master of business administration, executive MBA, master of accounting, doctor of philosophy, business certificate as well as many executive education programs. The business school is accredited by the Association to Advance Collegiate Schools of Business.

History
The school was established in 1919 as the Department of Commerce of the College of Arts of the University of North Carolina at Chapel Hill. 

In 1991, Frank Kenan continues his family’s legacy of supporting UNC by giving $10 million toward a new Business School building. The university changed its business school's name to Kenan-Flagler Business School in honor of Mary Lily Kenan and her husband, Henry Morrison Flagler.

Rankings

MBA Full-time Program Rankings (additional to chart)       
U.S. News & World Report
7th in undergraduate business
19th in full-time MBA programs 
 Beyond Grey Pinstripes (Aspen Institute)
7th in the United States
 Princeton Review and Entrepreneur
11th for graduate programs in entrepreneurship

MBA for Executives Programs
 The Wall Street Journal ranked the Weekend Program: 10
 Bloomberg BusinessWeek for the Weekend Program: 11
 Financial Times ranked OneMBA 29th in 2016

MBA@UNC Online
 The U.S. News & World Report ranked the MBA@UNC Online Program #1 in 2015

MAC Program (Master of Accounting)
 Public of Accounting Report: 7

Executive Development (Non-Degree Programs)
 Financial Times: 9 for custom programs:
 Bloomberg BusinessWeek: 14 for executive education:

People

Faculty
 Robert S. Adler, Consumer Advocate
 Howard Aldrich, Sociologist
 Richard A. Bettis
 Paolo Fulghieri, Financial Economist
 Rajdeep Grewal
 James H. Johnson Jr.
 Arne L. Kalleberg, Sociologist
 Jan-Benedict Steenkamp, expert on global marketing
 Valarie Zeithaml, Services marketing pioneer; developer of SERVQUAL

Alumni

 Gary Parr (BSBA '79), Deputy Chairman, Lazard Frères & Co.
 Hugh McColl Jr. (BSBA '57), Former Chairman and CEO, Bank of America Corporation
 Julian Robertson (BSBA '55), Chairman, Tiger Management
 Erskine Bowles (BSBA '67), former president, University of North Carolina System; former White House Chief of Staff; former head of Small Business Administration; former United Nations deputy envoy for tsunami relief
 John A. Allison IV, Chairman and Former CEO of BB&T (BSBA at UNC Kenan-Flagler) and current Director of Moelis & Company
 Mercer Reynolds: Businessman, finance chair of George W. Bush's Presidential campaign.
 David N. Senty, U.S. Air Force Major General
 G. Smedes York, MBA 1968, 33rd Mayor of Raleigh 1979-1983, Chairman of York Properties, Inc.
 Jason Kilar, Co-founder and former CEO, Hulu 
 Lee Ainslie, MBA, Founder and CEO of Maverick Capital (a $10B long/short hedge fund)
 Hubert C. Hegtvedt, U.S. Air Force Major General
 Michele Buck, MBA '87, CEO of The Hershey Company

See also
List of United States business school rankings
List of business schools in the United States
List of Atlantic Coast Conference business schools

References

Business schools in North Carolina
University of North Carolina at Chapel Hill schools
Educational institutions established in 1919
1919 establishments in North Carolina
The Washington Campus